Emamzadeh Seyyed Mohammad Hoseyn (also Romanized as Emāmzādeh Seyyed Moḩammad Ḩoseyn) is a village in Jereh Rural District, Jereh and Baladeh District, Kazerun County, Fars Province, Iran. At the 2006 census, its population was 141, in 27 families.

References 

Populated places in Kazerun County